The 2002–03 Scottish First Division was won by Falkirk. However, they were not promoted to the SPL because their stadium, Brockville Park, did not meet SPL criteria. Alloa Athletic and Arbroath were relegated to the Second Division.

League table

Attendances

The average attendances for Scottish First Division clubs for season 2002/03 are shown below:

Scottish First Division seasons
1
2
Scot